Ophiogomphus cecilia, the green snaketail, green gomphid, or green club-tailed dragonfly, is a species of dragonfly in the family Gomphidae.

Description
The only snaketail in Europe; resembles a large clubtail in general coloration and river habitat, but the 'front-end' is vivid apple green in mature individuals and the male appendages are short. It is the largest of the Gomphidae apart from Bladetail, with green eyes and 'face, and green thorax with thin black lines on top and side, the latter similar to those on Yellow Clubtail and Western Clubtail; at the base of abdomen the green is extending to S2, the rest of the abdomen has a discontinuous yellow pattern to S 10, generally broader than on clubtails and those on S3-7 more triangular in shape, and moderately clubbed at S8-9. The legs are extensively yellow. Males appendages are short and yellowish. Female yellow markings on the abdomen are broader than on males. It shows two tiny 'crests' on the back of the head, between eyes. Black lines on the thorax reduced in some individuals. Immatures lack any green.

Range
It is found in Austria, Belarus, Bulgaria, China, the Czech Republic, Denmark, Estonia, Finland, France, Germany, Hungary, Italy, Latvia, Lithuania, Luxembourg, Moldova, North Macedonia,  Poland, Portugal, Spain, Romania, Russia, Slovakia, Slovenia, Sweden, Switzerland, Turkey, and Ukraine.

The main distribution area is in Eastern Europe. In Asia Ophiogomphus cecilia reaches Kazakhstan, in the north northern Finland and northern Sweden. There are only a few reports of finds from western and southern Europe. In Germany, it occurs mainly in the eastern parts of the country, including in the Lüneburg Heath, on the Oder, the Spree, in Niederlausitz and in the central and eastern parts of Bavaria.

Habitat
The characteristic habitat of Ophiogomphus cecilia are creeks with a sandy-gravelly bottom, moderate flow speed and shallow water depth, shading in places by trees on the banks and little pollution. Most of the finds come from rivers and streams. The remaining sites are spread across a wide variety of water types, but none of them play a role as larval habitat.

Of a total of 2,700 exuvia that were collected between 1992 and 1994 in the mouth of the Swabian Rezat, most of them hung on the banks of a five-meter-wide and between 50 and 120 cm deep mill stream with a muddy to sandy bottom. There, Sparganium and / or Potamogeton grew on larger areas. The slowly flowing water (0.2 to 0.4 m / sec.) was shaded by 30% of the adjacent forest. The width of the water does not seem to play a decisive role for the larval development, since the species in Bavaria develops in 1.5 m wide brooks as well as in 50 m wide rivers.

Ecology
In Bavaria, hatching begins in some years as early as the second half of May and lasts well into August. The main flight time is from the end of July to mid-August. Observations are possible until the beginning of October.

Adult males occupy sunny, exposed sitting areas above running water, as well as stalks and branches protruding over the water, but also stones and sandbanks. In the vicinity of these waiting areas, the water usually flows agitated over the shallow, sandy bottom. The males usually defend the sitting areas against conspecifics, but usually, leave them again after a short time without fighting. No territorial formation can be established, but some males can appear on the same stretch of river for days. They avoid shaded areas. Areas bordered by wooded banks are usually flown around. Even after they have reached maturity, the adults sometimes move far away from their breeding waters.

Males can be detected at distances of up to two kilometres from the inhabited rivers in sun-exposed hillside forests on the edge of a valley. Individuals caught there could be found along the river later. When sexually mature animals were marked, the ratio of males to females was between 16:1 (Rezat) and 67:1 (Aurach). This is to explain the secret behaviour of the females when laying eggs. They usually press the egg balls in the cover of dense vegetation, the eggs are laid in seconds by repeatedly dipping the end of the abdomen into the water. They then immediately disappear from the water. There are also indications that the females also visit the breeding waters separately from the males in terms of space and time.

The larvae can reach relatively high densities. Up to ten larvae per square meter were found on a stream in the northern Upper Palatinate. Larvae hunt both burrowing and on the substrate surface. In addition, hide hunting is known, in which only the front part of the head capsule and the anal pyramid protrude from the substrate. The larval development usually takes three or four, possibly only two years.The hatch occurs close to the water's edge. The gender ratio in the exuvia is balanced. Hatching and flight areas do not necessarily have to be identical, exuvia can also be found in places where adult animals are only sporadically sighted.

Etymology

Taxonomy

References 

Dragonflies of Europe
Insects described in 1785
Ophiogomphus
Taxonomy articles created by Polbot